The Charles L. Manson House is a Frank Lloyd Wright designed home in Wausau, Wisconsin. The house was listed on the National Register of Historic Places on April, 5, 2016. Reference Number, 16000149. 

Built over two years (1938 - 1941) for a successful local insurance agent, the Charles and Dorothy Manson House is among Wright's Usonian designs. The home uses a square unit system, but introduces 30 and 60 degree angles to eliminate right angle corners. However, the strong horizontal line of the house descending three levels down the sloping wooded lot has the silhouette of Wright's Prairie School houses. 

Typical of Usonians, the walls are sandwich compositions of plywood and tidewater red cypress board and batten trimmed with local red (Ringle) brick. To protect the house against fierce winters, Wright sandwiched two extra layers into the walls. The house sits on a concrete slab with its back to the street.

References
 Storrer, William Allin. The Frank Lloyd Wright Companion. University Of Chicago Press, 2006,  (S.249)

External links
Listing of the Manson House on the National Register of Historic Places
Wright In Wisconsin - Wright And Like Tours
CHARLES L. MANSON HOUSE, WAUSAU, WISCONSIN (1938) (S.249)
Manson House Photo - Wausau

Frank Lloyd Wright buildings
Wausau, Wisconsin
Houses in Marathon County, Wisconsin